Heliciopsis velutina is a species of trees, in the family Proteaceae. The bark is dark brown. They have reddish brown flowers. The specific epithet velutina comes from the Latin meaning "velvety", referring to the petiole. They grow naturally in lowland mixed dipterocarp forests' habitats from sea level to  altitude in Peninsular Malaysia and Borneo.

References

velutina
Plants described in 1955
Trees of Peninsular Malaysia
Trees of Borneo